The .225 Winchester cartridge was introduced in 1964 by the Winchester Repeating Arms Company.

Description
Based on the .219 Zipper case but with a reduced rim diameter to fit the common .473" bolt face, it was intended as a replacement for the .220 Swift cartridge which had a reputation for burning out barrels.  Despite having a modern straight taper design, the round was eclipsed by the older .22-250 Remington, already a popular wildcat introduced commercially a year later.

The .225 Winchester was chambered in factory rifles by Winchester (Models 70 and 670) and Savage (Model 340).  All commercially produced rifles chambered in .225 Winchester were turn-bolt or break actions.  Winchester ceased producing rifles chambered in .225 Winchester in 1971, however seasonal production of loaded ammunition and brass continues by Winchester.  Reloading dies for the round are readily available.

The .225 Winchester's case is a parent case for some of SSK Industries' popular line of JDJ cartridges designed by J.D. Jones, chosen for its strength and semi-rimmed design which makes it well suited for use in break-open actions.

See also
 .224 Weatherby Magnum
 5 mm caliber 
 List of rifle cartridges
 Table of handgun and rifle cartridges

References

 .225 Win data at Accurate Powder

External links
 .225 Winchester at Chuck Hawks

225
225